Max Jacob Schnur (born 15 February 1993) is an American tennis player mostly playing on the ATP Challenger Tour, specializing in doubles. His highest ATP doubles ranking of World No. 87 was achieved on 12 September 2022.

College career
Schnur graduated from Columbia University in 2015.

Career finals

Doubles: 34 (18–15)

References

External links
 
 

1993 births
Living people
American male tennis players
Tennis people from New York (state)
Columbia Lions men's tennis players